was a Japanese author, theater critic, and calligraphy master. He was also called "The Master of the Bamboo Hut" (竹の屋主人).

He was born in Shitaya Ryuusenji-cho in Taitō Ward, Tokyo.

Among his works is his translation of Edgar Allan Poe's The Murders in the Rue Morgue. He is buried in Somei cemetery in Tokyo.

Works

 Tousei shounin katagi (当世商人気質 The Modern-Day Mercantile Spirit). Serialized in Yomiuri Shinbun, 1886-1889.
 Hito no uwasa (人の噂 Rumors). Serialized in Yomiuri Shinbun, 1886. 
 Soumatou(走馬燈 Revolving Lantern). Published in Yomiuri Shinbun, 1886. 
 Kontan (魂膽 Scheme). Published in Yomiuri Shinbun, 1888.
 Menbokutama (面目玉 Face). Published in Yomiuri Shinbun, 1889.
 Horidashimono (掘り出し物 Lucky Find). Yoshioka Shoseki, 1888.
 Ryouya (良夜 Moonlit Night). 1889.
 Kakeochi no kakeochi (驅落の驅落 Running Away from Running Away).
 Haikai kichigai (俳諧気違ひ Haikai Crazy).

See also
Japanese literature
List of Japanese authors

References

External links

Koson Aeba's works at Aozora Bunko (Japanese)

Japanese writers
1922 deaths
1855 births
People from Taitō
Translators of Edgar Allan Poe